Associação Desportiva Sanjoanense is a rink hockey club from São João da Madeira, Portugal.

Honours
Rink Hockey Cup Winners Cup: 1 (1985–86)

See also 
A.D. Sanjoanense

Rink hockey clubs in Portugal
1924 establishments in Portugal
Sports clubs established in 1924